Crystal Lake is a city in McHenry County in the U.S. state of Illinois. The population is 40,269 as of the 2020 Census, a 1.2% decrease from 2010. Crystal Lake is the largest city in McHenry County, part of the Chicago metropolitan area.

History

Founding

The City of Crystal Lake traces its origin to two separate communities which were established in the 1800s. Those communities were generally known as Nunda and Crystal Lake. In 1835, Ziba S. Beardsley had come to the shores of the lake and commented that the "waters were as clear as crystal", thereby giving the lake its name. Ziba Beardsley continued south to Naperville. In February 1836, the first white settlers, Beman and Polly Crandall and six of their ten children, came from New York State traveling to Crystal Lake in a covered wagon. Their original cabin was built in the vicinity of today's intersection of Virginia Street and Van Buren Street. Four of the Crandall children were born there. Najah Beardsley's family was the second to settle in the area; his grandson, William Beardsley, was the first white child born on the Crystal Lake prairie, on May 7, 1837.

The town was first known as Crystal Ville. It was changed to Crystal Lake sometime before 1840. The area known today as downtown Crystal Lake was first called Dearborn and later, Nunda (pronounced locally as “Nun-day”), from an area in New York where many settlers originated. The village of Dearborn was founded in the 1850s after an extension of railroads through the area. The first train station was built in 1856, although it was pre-fabricated and shipped from Chicago on a flatcar. At that time, the main business district for the village of Crystal Lake was located on Virginia Street, about one mile (1.6 km) southwest of the railroad station. The railroad served to connect both the people and industries of Crystal Lake and Dearborn to Chicago and the rest of the country. Dearborn grew quickly due to this new rail connection.

On October 7, 1868, Dearborn's name was changed to Nunda. The village was platted in 1868 by local surveyor, John Brink, after whom a downtown street is now named. The village included the area now generally bounded by Illinois Route 176 on the north, Crystal Lake Avenue on the south, Main Street on the east, and Walkup Avenue on the west. Much of the land was originally owned by two early settlers, Daniel Ellsworth and Simon S. Gates. The villages of Crystal Lake and Nunda were both incorporated in 1874. In 1908, the name of the village of Nunda changed its name to North Crystal Lake. Several attempts were made to consolidate the two villages, and finally, after much disagreement, the village of North Crystal Lake was annexed to the Village of Crystal Lake in 1914, and a consolidated city government was established.

Dole family

It was his dream to construct an elaborate estate that would reflect his position as a successful businessman. He was an early member of the Chicago Board of Trade, being associated with Armour, Dole & Co. in Chicago. To carry out his plan, he built a three-story mansion with adjoining gardens and stables. European craftsmen were imported to lay parquet floors, fashion archways and carve interior wood work from black walnut trees grown on the property. As a final touch, he brought in Italian artisans to build several marble fireplaces. According to Mr. Dole's obituary, construction costs exceeded $100,000, an enormous amount of money in those days.

The estate was known as Lakeland Farm. Mr. Dole lived there with his wife Julia, his mother-in-law, Mrs. Harriet Coffin, his two daughters, Mary Florence, Harriet (Hattie), and son, Sydney. Dole maintained the estate for over 30 years, entertaining lavishly. As an example, for his daughter's wedding in 1883 he built a spur line from the Chicago and Northwestern railway tracks almost to his doorstep. A canopied and carpeted walkway extended  from the front door to the train enabling the guests to walk to the mansion for the ceremony and return to the train without concern for the weather. Notable wedding guests included Julian Rumsey (mayor of Chicago and Dole's first cousin) and Levi Leiter (first partner with Marshall Field).

Mr. Dole's interests changed throughout the years. He laid out a half-mile racetrack on his property and purchased the finest horses that money could buy, soon accumulating a string of horses that was the envy of northern Illinois. It is said that Dole loved to go up in his tower (currently closed off) and watch his horses run. When tired of the fad of his stable, he disposed of his horses by holding an elaborate sale. The Doles lived in the mansion until the late 1890s when the property was sold to his son-in-law for $1.00.

During the early 1900s, the property was owned and operated by several different ice companies. Ice was harvested from Crystal Lake and shipped by rail to nearby Chicago. The advent of refrigeration brought about the decline of the ice business. After laying vacant for several years, the property was sold in 1922 to the Lake Development Company. The building was purchased by the First Congregational Church of Crystal Lake in 1977. The annex portion of the structure was renovated by thousands of hours of volunteer work. The Church named the facility “Lakeside Center” and operated it as a community activities center, hosting Friendship House Day Care Center for children, church offices, meeting rooms, reception hall, and retreat facilities. Today the Dole Mansion is owned by the Lakeside Legacy, along with Lakeside center, which is the building connected to the Dole Mansion. Dole Mansion is located along the lake, and there is a festival held on the grounds every year.

Eliza Ringling
Ringling Road is an east-west road which curves from Country Club Road back up to Lake Avenue. There are less than one dozen houses that claim a Ringling Road address; but those houses range from a small, stone cottage to large, imposing mansions. It is no mistake that Ringling Road provides the northern boundary for the Dole Mansion property. The road was named after Eliza "Lou" Ringling who, as founder of the Lake Development Company, purchased the Dole Mansion in 1922 and converted it into the first Crystal Lake Country Club. The transaction involved nearly a half million dollars and was one of the largest real estate deals handled in the area. The original Crystal Lake Country Club faltered in the stock market crash of 1929, and Mrs. Ringling, with her group of investors (the Lake Development Company) subdivided much of the large Dole estate into what is known as the Country Club Additions subdivision parts of which are in the neighboring village Lakewood, Illinois.

Eliza "Lou" Ringling was the widow of the oldest Ringling brother, Albert, of circus fame.

Teco pottery
The American Terra Cotta Tile and Ceramic Company was founded in 1881 just north of Crystal Lake, Illinois. Most of the workers at the tile and ceramic works factory came from Crystal Lake, The production consisted of drain tile, brick and architectural items. In 1886 the Gates Pottery was established as a subsidiary with William D. Gates, a Crystal Lake area native as its president. The company fabricated architectural glazed terra cotta that was used on buildings designed by architects Louis Sullivan and Frank Lloyd Wright in the style of the Prairie School. American Terra Cotta's company records show that architectural glazed terra cotta was used on many local buildings including Oak Manufacturing Company, Teckler Building, Cohn Store, Telephone Exchange and Commercial Building, El-Tovar Theatre, Crystal Lake High School and additions, Central School and additions, Pure Oil Research Lab and additions, Sinclair Refining Company Service Station, Warner Building, Citizens State Bank, Garbe Garage, Home State Bank, various Williams Street stores and bakeries, and Martinetti's Motel.

Gates used the facilities to experiment with clays and glazes in an effort to design a line of art pottery which led to the introduction of Teco pottery (from TErra COtta, but pronounced locally as "Tea-co") in 1902. Many of the pottery pieces were designed by architects such as Frank Lloyd Wright Produced for only a few years, this pottery exemplifies the Arts and Crafts Movement and today is highly sought after by art collectors. Teco pottery is in the collection of many museums.

Recent history

On April 11, 1965, during the Palm Sunday tornado outbreak, a large and devastating tornado damaged or destroyed large portions of the city. Six people were killed by the tornado, and a further 75 wounded. Damages in the city totaled over $1.5 million, as 80 homes and a shopping center were completely destroyed. Disaster shelters were set up to house the homeless, and then-governor of Illinois, Otto Kerner, Jr., personally visited the city to view the damage.

In the past 20 years, the history of Crystal Lake has consisted mainly of the growing of suburban subdivisions, as the population increased to 38,000 in the 2000 Census from 21,823 in the 1990 Census. In order to deal with the growth, Crystal Lake South High School was opened in 1978. Previously, Crystal Lake Community High School (now Crystal Lake Central High School) had served the entire city of Crystal Lake since 1924. Even more recently a third high school, Prairie Ridge High School, opened in 1997 north of the city to accommodate the spread moving into the area between Crystal Lake and the two communities directly to its north, Prairie Grove and Bull Valley.

Some challenges currently facing the city of Crystal Lake include a large and sudden increase in immigration, and an inconvenient road system leading to frequently snarled traffic. However, the overall quality of life and education in the city remains quite high. In addition, a robust city park system and continued revitalization of the downtown area, including a new city hall, have continued to make Crystal Lake an attractive community for new residents. Another positive note for the city is that Crystal Lake is the city where the tradition of giving gold coins to the Salvation Army anonymously began in 1982.

The Raue Center for the Arts, in the downtown district, has distinguished itself as a regional and national tourism draw. The National Piano Conference has been held in the Raue Center since 2012.

In 2015, Crystal Lake was ranked tenth best city among 1,268 U.S. cities with populations between 25,000 and 100,000 by WalletHub.

In 2016, it was reported that there were zero retail vacancies in the downtown district of Crystal Lake. This was the case until 2017.

On July 7, 2021, U.S. President Joe Biden visited McHenry County College in Crystal Lake, becoming the first sitting president to visit the city. Then-Vice President George H. W. Bush had twice visited Crystal Lake in 1988 while campaigning for president.

Crystal Lake Park District
The Crystal Lake Park District, a separate elected governing body not associated with the city, offers in excess of 40 parks (totaling over 2,000 acres) and recreation areas. Notable parks maintained by the Park District include the 140 acre Veteran Acres Park and Lippold Park, the largest single park in the district at 305 acres. Lippold Park has played host to the McHenry County Youth Sports Association Summer International 15-year-old Baseball Championships for the past 22 years, drawing teams from across the United States and Puerto Rico as well as from Japan, Brazil, and other countries. The Park District also owns and operates 2 beach parks located on the city namesake Crystal Lake and also maintains Illinois Nature Preserve land and the Col. Palmer House a historic landmark and home of the first settler in the area. Additionally, the district operates The Racket Club, an indoor/outdoor tennis facility that has 9 indoor courts. The facility is operated as an Enterprise Fund meaning that it is totally self-supporting with no tax dollars going towards it in any manner.

Geography

Neighborhoods

As the largest city in McHenry County, Crystal Lake contains three high schools and has many separate neighborhoods.

Starting from the north of the city, the ten largest neighborhoods are easy to trace out. The first has no de facto name like the others, but is referred to as "by Prairie Ridge," referring to the nearby high school of the same name. Houses in this neighborhood are large and widely spaced. The entire area lies just to the north of the city, from the downtown area to the adjacent community of Bull Valley. Some of the communities include Deer Wood, Covered Bridge Trails and Walk-up Woods. Next is downtown Crystal Lake, which rings Crystal Lake Central High School. Houses here range greatly in size and age, and it is the most diverse neighborhood in the city. Directly south of downtown Crystal Lake is the Coventry neighborhood, named for the major through street Coventry Lane. Students in the Coventry neighborhood attend either Central High School of Crystal Lake or Crystal Lake South High School. Oral tradition holds that Coventry was originally populated by pilots who fly out of O'Hare Airport. The neighborhood Burtons Bridge is located at the north-eastern side of Crystal Lake.

Students from Four Colonies attend both Central and South High School. South of Four Colonies is The Villages neighborhood, which is named for its major thoroughfare, Village Road. An important feature of The Villages is Indian Prairie Elementary School, which is built on a large and steep series of hills that is a favorite sledding location during the snowy months. The residents attend South High School. A neighborhood Northeast of Four Colonies is Wedgewood. Wedgewood includes five ponds, and a forest that backs up to Huntley Road, with a paved walking path. Wedgewood has five brick entrance signs saying "Wedgewood", and 3 prominent entrances; the front entrance on Huntley Road's intersection with Lakeview Drive, the back entrance on Huntley Road's intersection with Boneset Drive, and the side entrance on Country Club Road. Wedgewood consists of single family homes and multi-family dwellings such as townhouses. Wedgewood Drive circles the whole neighborhood, and is a -mile circle.

Other neighborhoods in Crystal Lake ring the town's namesake lake, and are called West End, North Shore, and the Vista. These neighborhoods consist of many older homes built on the lake shore, and vary greatly in size and style. Effectively a neighborhood and occupying the entire south shore of the lake is the independent Village of Lakewood, historically a restricted community connected strongly to the Crystal Lake Country Club alongside it.

There are also numerous smaller subdivisions found in various spots around the city.

Climate
The city's climate is much like that of its large neighboring city, Chicago. The city experiences hot summers and cold winters, with temperatures slightly more extreme than those of closer suburbs, because rural land still surrounds the city. Due to the lack of the urban heat island effect, Crystal Lake experiences colder nights and lower precipitation than recorded at Chicago. High temperatures are usually comparable to those in Chicago, with only a few degrees difference on most days.

Temperatures in July, and in summer in general, can frequently exceed , and occasionally exceed , although this does not happen each year. In winter, the low temperatures fall below  on many (often as many as fifteen or twenty) occasions per year.

The wettest month of the year is August, when thunderstorms contribute brief, heavy downpours of rain. July is the second-wettest month of the year, also mainly due to thunderstorms. However, long dry spells can also occur at this time of year, sometimes lasting weeks. The two driest months of the year are January and February, where almost all of the precipitation falls as snow. Large snowstorms, although rare, do occur and can accumulate large amounts of snow. In many years, at least one storm will deliver  of snow in one day. Most snow-bearing systems are Alberta clippers, while the more infrequent heavy snows are caused by Panhandle hooks.

Government
See the full article, List of mayors of Crystal Lake, Illinois

Mayor
Haig Haleblian

City council
The city council consists of Ellen Brady, Cathy Ferguson, Brett Hopkins, Cameron Hubbard, Mandy Montford, Ian Philpot.

City clerk
Nick Kachiroubas is the City Clerk in Crystal Lake.

Demographics

2020 census

As of the 2020 Census, there were 40,269 people, 14,780 households, and 10,551 families living in the city. There were 15,371 total housing units, and 31.9% were in multi-unit structures. The racial makeup of the city was 79.8% White (76.92% white non-Hispanic), 1.5% Black or African American, 0.4% Native American, 2.8% Asian, <0.01% Pacific Islander, 6.1% from other races, and 9.3% from two or more races. Hispanic or Latino of any race were 14.8% of the population.

35.4% of the households included children under 18, 51.0% were married couples living together, 5.3% had a female householder with no spouse present, and 2.6% had a male householder with no spouse present.

In the city, the population was spread out, with 6.1% under the age of 5, 24.0% under the age of 18, 76.0% aged 18 and older, and 13.5% who were 65 years of age or older. The median age was 39.6 years. For every 100 females, there were 97.9 males.

The median income for a household in the city was $87,578, and the median income for a family was $105,324. Males had a median income of $58,611 versus $41,026 for females. The median income for the city was $36,405. About 4.9% of families and 6.9% of the population were below the poverty line, including 9.9% of those under age 18 and 6.2% of those age 65 or over.

In 1990, the population of Latinos (Hispanics) was at 0.1%. Per the 2000 US Census, the Latino population increased to 7% and per the 2010 US Census, the Latino population increased to 11.7%. As of 2020, the population of Latinos is 14.8%.

2010 Census 
As of the 2010 Census, there were 40,743 people, 14,421 households, and 10,551 families living in the city. The population density was 2,220/sq mi (857/km). There were 15,176 total housing units and 22% of all housing units were in multi-unit structures. The racial makeup of the city was 90.2% White, 1.0% Black or African American, 0.4% Native American, 2.5% Asian, <0.01% Pacific Islander, 4.1% from other races, and 1.8% from two or more races. Hispanic or Latino of any race were 11.7% of the population.

39.2% of the households included children under 18, 58.9% were married couples living together, 10.1% had a female householder with no husband present, and 26.8% were non-families. 22.1% of all households were made up of individuals living alone, and 20.3% had someone at least 65 years old living alone. The average household size was 2.81 and the average family size was 3.31.

In the city, the population was spread out, with 28.1% under the age of 18, 8.% from 18 to 24, 26.2% from 25 to 44, 27.7% from 45 to 64, and 10.0% who were 65 years of age or older. The median age was 37 years. For every 100 females, there were 97.6 males.

The median income for a household in the city was $78,311, and the median income for a family was $91,870. Males had a median income of $61,982 versus $44,288 for females. The median income for the city was $36,405. About 5.2% of families and 6.2% of the population were below the poverty line, including 9.1% of those under age 18 and 5.3% of those age 65 or over.

Culture and sites of interest

Crystal Lake, as a city, is large enough to entertain its cultural institutions. However, it also shares many cultural opportunities with the city of Chicago, and the other large communities which surround it, as they are easily accessible from Crystal Lake, and vice versa. The city is home to the Northwest Herald, the only daily newspaper published in McHenry County. The newspaper deals mainly with local issues, but also carries national and world news. Churches are also a large influence within the city, hosting many annual events. Crystal Lake is also home to WZSR Star 105.5, owned by Alpha Media, which broadcasts throughout the northwest suburbs and Fox Valley.

Another large presence in the city is the Crystal Lake Park District, which runs all of the city's numerous parks and the yearly events which take place within them. Two major parks run by the park district are Veterans Acres, along Walkup Road, and Main Beach, along with the namesake Crystal Lake. Crystal Lake is open whenever the weather is accommodating. However, boating is often restricted due to disputes with both the homeowners on the lake and the village of Lakewood, in which approximately 30% of the lake lies. The Crystal Lake Rowing Club has a boathouse in Kamijima Park, on the west end of Crystal Lake, and rows on the lake during the no-wake hours (usually early mornings and early evenings). In Crystal Lake lies the famed Dole mansion, where visitors can take tours for a small donation.

Among the city's sites of interest is the historic downtown district. The downtown district, which recently has undergone a revitalization, is home to many small specialty shops and businesses, and is a local shopping district. Also located in the downtown district is the Raue Center for the Arts, which seats 750 and performs plays and hosts concerts throughout the year. Raue Center has recently transformed itself into a regional destination spot by providing an in house professional theater company, Williams Street Repertory, Jazz Festival launched by Ramsey Lewis and hosting several recent Tony, Grammy, and Academy award winners. The Raue Center has received four MacArthur Grants and regularly receives National Endowment for the Arts support. The city is also home to the Crystal Lake Strikers Drumline, Crystal Lake Community Band, and Encore Music Academy, home of Encore Youth Choir, McHenry County Youth Orchestra and Voices in Harmony (formerly known as the Crystal Lake Community Choir).

The Col. Gustavus A. Palmer House is a historic residence in Crystal Lake, being constructed in 1858.

Economy
The economy of Crystal Lake is fairly decentralized, as there is no central industry within the city. There are several large companies, but none of them is a majority employer. The main economic activities in the city are retail, dining, and light industry. This includes small, specialized, local-owned shops and restaurants as well as broader-ranged national chains. There are several industrial parks in Crystal Lake, which are full of small, independently-owned businesses which engage in various industries, such as landscaping or automotive repair.

The shopping center for most of Crystal Lake centers on "the strip", a long stretch of road that runs along what once used to be Crystal Pointe Mall but is now a series of strip malls. The strip is located on Route 14 between Route 31 and Dole Avenue. As the name suggests, this area has mostly national chains. Another shopping area is the downtown district, which is where some, small independent stores are located. Because of parking challenges in the downtown area, many thriving independent businesses can be found in convenient areas throughout the city where access for their customers is more centralized and parking is more abundant.

The south side of the city features several gravel quarries. A majority of these quarries are already exhausted, and have been allowed to fill with water, forming an area known as the Vulcan Lakes, also stretching into Lake in the Hills and Algonquin. The two northernmost lakes are now known as Three Oaks Recreation Area. Recreational operations at this site started in Autumn, 2010, and it has since become one of the most popular destinations in Crystal Lake.

Education
The city of Crystal Lake high schools are in a different school district than the middle schools and elementary schools. High schools in the city are run by Community High School District 155, which runs four high schools, including all three in the city of Crystal Lake. Crystal Lake Community Consolidated School District 47 runs all middle schools and elementary schools in the city of Crystal Lake. Prairie Grove Consolidated School District #46 also serves a portion of northeast Crystal Lake.

There are five high schools which serve the city of Crystal Lake. The oldest, Crystal Lake Central High School (Central for short), graduated its first class in 1924 and was known as Crystal Lake Community High School when it opened. It is located in the downtown area of the city, and has an enrollment of approximately 1600. This school serves Crystal Lake and Lakewood, as well as the far west side of Huntley and southwestern Woodstock. In response to pressures from increasing population, Crystal Lake South High School (South for short), was opened in 1978. When it was completed, the school was ridiculed for being remotely located and surrounded by corn fields. It now stands boxed in by suburban development. Prairie Ridge High School (often simply called PR) opened in the fall of 1997, again due to increasing population pressure. The school stands on a hill off to the north of the city. The school serves mostly students who live in the 60012 and northern/eastern 60014 ZIP code areas of Crystal Lake, as well as Prairie Grove, Ridgefield, Oakwood Hills, and Burtons Bridge. They also serve some students who live in Cary, Woodstock, McHenry and Bull Valley. A very small portion of far-eastern Crystal Lake is served by Cary-Grove High School, which opened in 1961. It's located all the way in Cary, Illinois, and has an enrollment of approximately 1795. Students who live on the far east side of Crystal Lake attend Cary-Grove. The school also serves Cary, Fox River Grove, Barrington, Trout Valley, and Oakwood Hills as well. Lastly for public schools a very small portion of western Crystal Lake is served by Woodstock High School. Also located in Crystal Lake is Faith Lutheran High School which serves the larger McHenry County area.

Crystal Lake is home to ten elementary schools and three high schools. Three of the elementary schools have been constructed since 1990 due to the increasing expansion of suburban developments.
The names of the ten elementary schools include:
Canterbury (named after the Coventry subdivision)
Coventry (named after the Coventry subdivision)
Glacier Ridge
Husmann (named after a long-time principal, formerly called "Central" and the oldest elementary)
Indian Prairie
North (adjacent to Bernotas Middle School campus)
South (adjacent to Lundahl Middle School campus)
West (at west end of Crystal Lake itself)
Woods Creek
Prairie Grove

There are four middle schools in Crystal Lake:
Bernotas (Formerly North Junior High, now named after a longtime principal) was built as North Junior High in 1969 and in 2003, the board of education approved a name change to Richard F. Bernotas Middle School-North Middle Campus. Bernotas Middle School's mascot is Thor, represented by a Viking, which is also RFB's name for its sports team. Most Students who attend Bernotas later attend Crystal Lake Central High School, and some later attend Crystal Lake South High School or Prairie Ridge High School.
Hannah Beardsley, which opened in 1996 and is named after the first school teacher in Crystal Lake. Its mascot is the bear, and its colors are orange and blue. Most students who attend Hannah Beardsley later attend Prairie Ridge High School, and some later attend Crystal Lake Central High School or Crystal Lake South High School.
Lundahl (Formerly South) was built as South Middle School during 1958–1959. It opened in 1959, and in 1966, the name was changed to Leon J. Lundahl Jr. High School, in honor of Leon J. Lundahl, former Superintendent of Schools for District 47. Also Lundahl Junior High School became an accredited middle school in the spring of 1995 and the name was officially changed to Lundahl Middle School Campus for the opening of the 1996-97 school year. Most students who attend Lundahl later attend Crystal Lake South High School, and some later attend Crystal Lake Central High School.
Prairie Grove Junior High School was built in 1998 and opened in 1999 which is the newest Middle School in Crystal Lake. It also serves its very own district known as District 46. Prairie Grove is home to the Panthers. Most students who attend Prairie Grove later attend Prairie Ridge High School.

Additional schools serving Crystal Lake include Lord and Savior Lutheran School, a Pre-K-8 grade school of the Wisconsin Evangelical Lutheran Synod in Crystal Lake, St. Thomas the Apostle, a private Roman Catholic school that serves Pre-K through eighth grade, also in Crystal Lake, Immanuel Lutheran School, a private Lutheran school that serves Pre-K through eighth grade, also in Crystal Lake, Alexander Leigh Center for Autism in McHenry, a full day, year-round therapeutic day school for children 3–21 years old with autism spectrum disorder, OHI, multiple disabilities, developmental delay and/or intellectual disabilities, and the School of Expressive Arts & Learning campus in Woodstock for those with learning disorders and autism spectrum disorder.

Additionally, there are two colleges in Crystal Lake:
McHenry County College, a community college, offers associate degrees. Columbia College also has an extension campus based in Crystal Lake.

Public transportation

The Metra Rail Union Pacific Northwest Line provides transportation to and from Chicago, and all other stations on Metra's Northwest Line. Taxi service in Crystal Lake is provided by the Crystal Lake Cab Company, Crystal Lake Taxi Services, and American Dependable. Also serving Crystal Lake is the Pace Bus system, which is the owned by the RTA (Regional Transit Authority).

Sister cities
Holzgerlingen, Germany (since 1996)

Notable people

See also

Cary, Illinois
Lakewood, Illinois
Bull Valley, Illinois
Huntley, Illinois
Woodstock, Illinois

References

External links

Crystal Lake website

 
Cities in Illinois
Populated places established in 1836
Chicago metropolitan area
Cities in McHenry County, Illinois
1836 establishments in Illinois